Mappe Of is the stage name of Tom Meikle (born February 26, 1993), a Canadian multi-instrumentalist, songwriter, producer, and avant-folk musician from Whitby, Ontario.

Signed to Paper Bag Records, he released his debut album A Northern Star, A Perfect Stone in 2017.

His sophomore release, The Isle of Ailynn, was a mixed-media concept record which included a VR video series made with Google Tilt Brush - released in 2019. The album was recorded at The Tragically Hip's Bathouse Studios in Bath, ON and was accompanied by 9 oil paintings by Canadian artist, Quinn Henderson.

Discography 
 "A Northern Star, A Perfect Stone"
 Release: July 28, 2017
 Format: CD, Digital
 Label: Paper Bag Records

 "The Isle of Ailynn"
 Release: November 1, 2019
 Format: CD, Digital
 Label: Paper Bag Records

References

Canadian singer-songwriters
Indie folk musicians
People from Whitby, Ontario
Paper Bag Records artists
1993 births
Living people
Musicians from the Regional Municipality of Durham